Elena Rosell Aragón (born 30 April 1986 in Valencia) is a Spanish motorcycle racer. She was the first female Spanish rider in world championship racing when she substituted for an injured Moto2 rider in 2011.

During 2019 she competed in the CIV Stock Spanish series.

Previously she rode in the RFME Campeonato de España de Velocidad (CEV) Superstock 600 aboard a Kawasaki ZX-6R.

Career statistics

Grand Prix motorcycle racing

By season

Races by year
(key)

References

External links

1986 births
Living people
Spanish motorcycle racers
Moto2 World Championship riders
Female motorcycle racers